Ellen Foley (born 1951) is an American singer and actress who has appeared on Broadway and television, where she co-starred in the sitcom Night Court for one season. In music, she has released five solo albums but is best known for her collaborations with rock singer Meat Loaf.

Early life and education 
Foley was born in St. Louis, Missouri, the daughter of John and Virginia B. Foley. She attended Webster University.

Career

Vocalist
Foley gained public recognition through singing a duet with Meat Loaf on the hit single "Paradise by the Dashboard Light" from the 1977 album Bat Out of Hell. Foley's part was recorded individually and in one take with Meat Loaf present in the room so she could sing in character.  Although Karla DeVito (who toured with Meat Loaf in support of the album) is featured in the music video, DeVito is lip synching to Foley's vocals.

Her debut album Night Out was released in 1979; the album's single "What's a Matter Baby" reached No. 7 in the Dutch charts and No. 92 on the US charts. The single "We Belong To The Night" reached No.1 in the Netherlands. The album itself, which peaked at No. 152, was produced by Ian Hunter and Mick Ronson. Foley recorded a duet with Ian Hunter in 1980, "We Gotta Get Outta Here". Her creative relationship with Hunter also led her to singing backing vocals on the Iron City Houserockers' 1980 album Have a Good Time but Get Out Alive!, produced by Hunter, Ronson, and The E Street Band's Steven Van Zandt.

She also sings in the title cut of the 1979 Blue Öyster Cult album Mirrors and on The Clash album Sandinista! (released in 1980) in the songs "Hitsville UK" and "Corner Soul", and on the unreleased track "Blonde Rock 'n' Roll". In 1981, all four members of The Clash appeared on her second album, The Spirit of St. Louis, and Mick Jones and Joe Strummer co-wrote a number of songs for the album. Jones produced the album, which also featured members of The Blockheads and peaked at No. 137 on the US charts. In 1982, she provided backing vocals on The Clash's song "Car Jamming" from the album Combat Rock. The Clash's hit song "Should I Stay or Should I Go", written and sung by Jones, was about the turbulent relationship he shared with Foley at the time.

She released her third solo album Another Breath in 1983; it failed to chart. In 1984, she sang backing vocals on Joe Jackson's album Body & Soul and had a large role in the music video for Utopia's "Crybaby".

Foley was one of four female vocalists to front the group Pandora's Box, formed by Jim Steinman in the late 1980s. Their album Original Sin, released in 1989, was the first to feature the song "It's All Coming Back to Me Now" (vocals by Elaine Caswell); both Celine Dion and a duet between Meat Loaf and Marion Raven had separate chart successes with that song in some countries, years later.

Broadway, film and television
Foley studied acting at HB Studio in New York City. She has appeared on Broadway in such shows as Me and My Girl and the revival of Hair, and off-Broadway in Beehive. Foley originated the role of The Witch in Stephen Sondheim's Into the Woods at the Old Globe Theater in San Diego, but was replaced by Bernadette Peters before the musical opened on Broadway. Foley eventually played the role on Broadway from August 1, 1989 until the show's closing on September 3, 1989.

Her best known television acting role is that of Billie Young on Night Court for season two (1984–85), after which she was succeeded by Markie Post as Christine Sullivan, who had been Reinhold Weege's first choice for the public defender part, but Post had been unavailable while under contract on the television series The Fall Guy on ABC. Foley was reportedly let go from the series because producers felt her relationship with star Harry Anderson was more like that of a brother and sister than as potential paramours. She had roles in Miloš Forman's film adaptation of the stage musical Hair (1979), as well as in the movies Fatal Attraction (1987), Married to the Mob (1988) and Cocktail (1988). Foley was also in the short-lived 1977 series 3 Girls 3, co-starring with Debbie Allen and Mimi Kennedy.

Other pursuits
As of the mid-2000s, she teaches voice at The Paul Green School of Rock Music in Manhattan, New York City, New York.

Personal life 
In 1990, Foley married writer Doug Bernstein, co-author of the Off-Broadway revue Showing Off.

Filmography

Discography

Studio albums 
 Night Out (1979) Epic - [NL #1; UK #68; AU #13]
 Spirit of St. Louis (1981) Epic - [NL #35; UK #57; AU #61]
 Another Breath (1983) Epic
 About Time (2013)
Fighting Words ( 2021 )

Note: all of these were issued by Epic within the U.S. on vinyl LP. They have been reissued on Compact Disc by Wounded Bird Records.

Compilations 
 The Very Best of (1992)

Singles 
 "We Belong to the Night" / "Young Lust" (1979) - [AU #15; NL #1; South Africa #7]
 "What's a Matter Baby" / "Hideaway" (1979) [NL #7; US #92]
 "Sad Song" / "Stupid Girl" (1980)
 "Stupid Girl" / "Young Lust" (1980)
 "The Shuttered Palace" / "Beautiful Waste of Time" (1981) - [AU #48]
 "Torchlight" / "Game of a Man" (1981)
 "Torchlight" / "Le palais" (1981)
 "Boys in the Attic" / "Beat of a Broken Heart" (1983)
 "Nightline (Single Version)" / "Beat of a Broken Heart (1983)
 "Nightline (Dance Mix - Long Version)" / "Nightline (Dance Mix - Short Version)"  "Nightline (Dub)" [12" Maxi-Single]
 "Heaven Can Wait" (2015)

With Pandora's Box 
 Original Sin (1989)

Guest appearances 
 "Paradise by the Dashboard Light" (1977) (from Bat Out of Hell by Meat Loaf)
 "Mirrors" (1979) (from Mirrors by Blue Öyster Cult)
 "Hitsville U.K.", "Corner Soul", "Washington Bullets" and "Blonde Rock 'n' Roll" (1980) (from Sandinista! by The Clash)
 "We Gotta Get Out of Here" (1980) (from Welcome to the Club by Ian Hunter)
 "Car Jamming" (1982) (from Combat Rock by The Clash)
 Body and Soul (1984) (by Joe Jackson)

References

External links
The Ellen Foley Webzine

Information page and discography

1951 births
Living people
Actresses from St. Louis
American film actresses
American musical theatre actresses
American television actresses
American women rock singers
Epic Records artists
Musicians from St. Louis
Webster University alumni
21st-century American women